Ferdinand Reinhardt Bie (16 February 1888 – 9 November 1961) was a Norwegian track and field athlete. At the 1912 Summer Olympics in Stockholm he won the silver medal in pentathlon. On winner Jim Thorpe's subsequent disqualification for having played semi-professional baseball in 1913, Bie was declared Olympic champion, but refused to accept the gold medal from the IOC. In 1982 Thorpe was reinstated as champion by the IOC; however, Bie was still listed as co-champion until the IOC announced 15 July 2022 that Thorpe's gold medal had been reinstated and Bie became the silver medalist.

He also finished eleventh in the long jump, and competed in 110 metres hurdles and decathlon, but failed to finish. He became Norwegian champion in long jump in 1910 and 1917 and in 110 m hurdles in 1910.

References

External links
 

1888 births
1961 deaths
Norwegian pentathletes
Norwegian decathletes
Norwegian male long jumpers
Athletes (track and field) at the 1912 Summer Olympics
Olympic athletes of Norway
Olympic gold medalists for Norway
Medalists at the 1912 Summer Olympics
Olympic gold medalists in athletics (track and field)
Olympic male pentathletes
Olympic decathletes
Sportspeople from Drammen
20th-century Norwegian people